The Lebanon women's national under-20 football team, colloquially known as "the Lady Cedars", represents Lebanon in international women's youth football. The team is controlled by the Lebanon Football Association (LFA), the governing body for football in Lebanon. The team also serves as the women's national under-19 and women's national under-18 football team of Lebanon. 

While the team has never participated in either the FIFA U-20 Women's World Cup or the AFC U-20 Women's Asian Cup, they have won two WAFF U-18 Girls Championship titles, in 2019 and 2022, and were runners-up in 2018.

History 

The national team played their first competitive matches at the qualifiers for the 2015 AFC U-19 Women's Championship in November 2014. Drawn with Jordan, Uzbekistan and India, Lebanon lost all three games, finishing last in their qualifying group.

Following funding and initiatives by the Lebanese Football Association towards women's football, and more specifically youth women's football, the women's national youth teams started to see success, especially in Western Asia. As of 2020, there were separate club leagues for the U15s, U17s, U19s and senior.

In 2018 Lebanon hosted the inaugural WAFF U-18 Women's Championship between August and September, in preparation for the 2019 AFC U-19 Women's Championship qualification the following October. After defeating Palestine 3–0 in the opening game, Lebanon lost 2–1 to Jordan in the effective final of the WAFF Championship and finished runners-up. In October 2018, Lebanon hosted their group in the first round of Asian qualifiers, in which they were drawn with Australia, Mongolia and Hong Kong; despite losing 2–0 to Australia, Lebanon won against the other two teams (thanks to a four-goal haul by Yara Bou Rada against Hong Kong and three goals by Samira Awad) and qualified to the second round. They were the only Arab country to do so.

During this period, most of the U19s players were also called up to the senior team. In January 2019, 17 of the 23 players called up to the 2019 WAFF Women's Championship in Bahrain came from the U19 team, bringing the average age of the squad to 18.9 years. Lebanon eventually finished third. The players returned in April 2019 to compete in the second round of Asian U-19 qualifiers. Needing a second-place finish in their group of four teams to reach the final tournament, Lebanon finished last after losing against South Korea, Vietnam and Iran.

The U18/19's first success came in 2019, in the second edition of the WAFF U-18 Championship in Bahrain. After winning all three games in the group stage, Lebanon advanced the semi-finals, where they defeated Palestine 4–2 to reach the final against hosts Bahrain. Lebanon won 3–0 and were crowned champions for the first time. Three years later, in 2022, Lebanon won their second-consecutive WAFF Championship title on home soil after beating Syria 5–1 in the final.

Competitive record

FIFA U-20 Women's World Cup

AFC U-20 Women's Asian Cup

WAFF U-18 Girls Championship

Recent results and matches

2022

2023

Players

Current squad
The following players were called up for the 2022 WAFF U-18 Girls Championship.

Recent call-ups
The following footballers were part of a national selection in the past 12 months, but are not part of the current squad.

Top scorers

. Highlighted names denote a player called up in the last 12 months.

See also
Lebanon women's national football team
Lebanon women's national under-17 football team
Lebanon national under-20 football team
Women's football in Lebanon
Football in Lebanon

Notes

References

External links

under-20
Youth football in Lebanon
Asian women's national under-20 association football teams